Edward D. Anderson (January 22, 1868 – May 23, 1940) was an American Brigadier general who served during World War I.

Early life 
Anderson was born in Jasper, Marion County, Tennessee. He attended Lieutenant Braden's school in Highland Falls, New York before entering the United States Military Academy. He graduated number ten out of sixty-five in the class of 1891.

Career 
After graduating, he was commissioned in the Fourth Cavalry and joined his troop at Fort Walla Walla, Washington. In 1897, he was transferred to the Tenth Cavalry where he commanded Troop C during the Spanish–American War. He also served as the topographical officer of the Second Cavalry Brigade. Anderson was wounded during the action at San Juan Hill on July 1, 1898, and awarded a Silver Star citation.

From September 1898 to June 1899, he was an instructor of chemistry, geology, and mineralogy at the United States Military Academy. He was promoted to major in July 1899 and served with the 26th United States Volunteer Infantry. In 1901, he reverted to his permanent rank of captain with the 12th Cavalry in south Texas. This Cavalry was in the Philippines from 1903–1905 and once back in the United States Anderson became regimental quartermaster. Anderson attended the Mounted Service School at Fort Riley, Kansas, in 1914 as well as the Army Service School special course in 1915, where he was retained as an instructor.

From May–July 1917, Anderson was an observer with the British and French troops and from August 1917 – August 1921 and he was detailed with the General Staff. From August 8, 1918 to October 31, 1919, he was a brigadier general in the National Army. He was then chairman of the equipment committee of the General staff and then served as Chief of the operations branch until August 1921.

After more than thirty-four years of service, Anderson retired on December 21, 1921. He became a brigadier general on the retired list by operation of 1930.

Awards 
Army Distinguished Service Medal
Silver Star Citation

Death and legacy 
Edward D. Anderson died at the age of seventy-two on May 23, 1940.

References

Bibliography
Cullum, George W. Biographical Register of the Officers and Graduates of the U.S. Military Academy at West Point, N.Y.: From Its Establishment, in 1802, to 1890 : with the Early History of the United States Military Academy. Boston and New York: Houghton, Mifflin and Company, 1891.
Davis, Henry Blaine. Generals in Khaki. Raleigh, NC: Pentland Press, 1998.  

1868 births
1940 deaths
United States Army generals
United States Military Academy alumni
People from Jasper, Tennessee
Recipients of the Distinguished Service Medal (US Army)
Recipients of the Silver Star
United States Army generals of World War I
American military personnel of the Spanish–American War
Military personnel from Tennessee